The 2010 Victorian Premier League season is the 99th season of the Victorian Premier League, and will be contested by 12 clubs.

Teams
Victorian Premier League teams for the 2010 season:

Promotion and relegation
Teams promoted from Division 1:
(After the end of the 2009 season.)
Bentleigh Greens SC
Northcote City SC

Teams relegated to Division 1:
(After the end of the 2009 season.)
Preston Lions FC
Whittlesea Zebras FC

League table
The regular season concluded on 6 September.

See also
Victorian Premier League
Football Federation Victoria

References

Victorian Premier League seasons
Victorian Premier League, 2010
2010 domestic association football leagues